Kose is a small borough in Kose Parish, Harju County, Estonia.

Kose may also refer to:

Places
Kose Parish, a municipality in Harju County
Kose, Võru Parish, a small borough in Võru Parish, Võru County
Kose, Ida-Viru County, a village in Jõhvi Parish, Ida-Viru County
Kose, Jõgeva County, a village in Pajusi Parish, Jõgeva County
Kose, Pärnu County, a village in Vändra Parish, Pärnu County
Kose, Tallinn, a subdistrict of Tallinn
Kose, Võru, a subdistrict of Võru

People

As a surname
Köse (surname)

Business
Kosé, a Japanese personal care company

Other
KOSE, a radio station in Arkansas, United States